Paul Perry Dixon (August 28, 1907 – January 20, 1994) was an American baseball pitcher in the Negro leagues. He played from 1928 to 1938 with several teams. His brother, Rap, also played in the Negro leagues.

References

External links
 and Baseball-Reference Black Baseball stats and Seamheads

1907 births
1994 deaths
Baltimore Black Sox players
Harrisburg Giants players
Newark Eagles players
New York Black Yankees players
New York Cubans players
Philadelphia Stars players
Washington Pilots players
20th-century African-American sportspeople